The Church of Saint Vincent Pallotti is a Roman Catholic church in Vinkovci, Croatia.

History 

The church was built from 1985 till 1989.

It was damaged by an artillery shell on 15 September 1991, during the Croatian War of Independence, but later it was renovated.

References 

Churches in Croatia
Vinkovci
Roman Catholic churches in Vukovar-Syrmia County